The 2016–17 Zimbabwe Tri-Series was a One Day International (ODI) cricket tournament that was held in Zimbabwe in November 2016. It was a tri-nation series between the national representative cricket teams of Zimbabwe, Sri Lanka and the West Indies. The Sri Lankan team were originally scheduled to tour Zimbabwe for two Tests, three ODIs and one Twenty20 International (T20I). However, the ODIs and T20I were replaced by this tri-series.

DRS technology was used for the first time in a limited-overs series in Zimbabwe. This follows its use in the second Test in Zimbabwe's series against Sri Lanka that immediately preceded the tri-series.

Sri Lanka won the tournament by beating Zimbabwe by 6 wickets in the final.

Squads

Shane Dowrich and Miguel Cummins were added to the West Indies' squad in place of Marlon Samuels and Alzarri Joseph. Darren Bravo was dropped from the West Indies' squad after he posted a comment on Twitter that the West Indies Cricket Board (WICB) deemed to be "inappropriate and unacceptable". He was replaced by Jason Mohammed. Sunil Narine left the squad due to personal reasons and was replaced  by Devendra Bishoo.

Points table
 Qualified for the Final

Matches

1st ODI

2nd ODI

3rd ODI

4th ODI

5th ODI

6th ODI

Final

References

External links
 Series home at ESPN Cricinfo

2016 in Sri Lankan cricket
2016 in West Indian cricket
2016 in Zimbabwean cricket
International cricket competitions in 2016–17
International cricket competitions in Zimbabwe